Colonel George Armand Furse  (23 August 1834 – 3 April 1906) was a British Army officer and author.

He was a colonel in the 42nd Royal Highlanders Black Watch and author of The Art of Marching (1901), Information in War: its Acquisition and Transmission (1895), Mobilization and Embarkation of an Army Corps (1883), Military Expeditions beyond the Seas (1897), Provisioning Armies in the Field (1899), and Marengo and Hohenlinden (1903). His 1883 book The Line of Communication was republished in 2008 by Kessinger Publishing

Furse is buried at Aldershot Military Cemetery. His great niece Aileen Armanda Furse married noted Russian spy Kim Philby.

References

External links
Complete list of Furse's publications on New General Catalog of Old Books and Authors
Digital copy of Furse's Military Expeditions beyond the Seas (Volume 1)
 Digital copy of Furse's Military Expeditions beyond the Seas (Volume 2)

1834 births
1906 deaths
Companions of the Order of the Bath
Burials at Aldershot Military Cemetery
42nd Regiment of Foot officers
Black Watch officers